Tapipa is a town in the state of Miranda, Venezuela, in the Venezuelan Coastal Range near the Tuy River. It was founded on 20 January 1784 as a settlement for labourers on surrounding cacao plantations. The population of Tapipa is largely Afro-Venezuelan. The 1971 census recorded 891 inhabitants.

References

Populated places in Miranda (state)
Populated places established in 1784